The 1907 Oregon Agricultural Aggies football team represented Oregon Agricultural College (now known as Oregon State University) as an independent during the 1907 college football season. 

In their second season under head coach Fred Norcross, the Aggies compiled a perfect 6–0 record, did not allow any of their opponents to score, and outscored their opponents by a combined total of 137 to 0.

After beating St. Vincent's, the Aggies' proclaimed themselves "Champions of the Pacific Coast". 

This is still the only perfect season in Oregon State history, and moreover, they did not allow a single point this season.

Schedule

References

Oregon Agricultural
Oregon State Beavers football seasons
College football undefeated seasons
Oregon Agricultural Aggies football